Diana Dierks (born January 13, 1944) is an American politician. She served as a Republican member for the 71st district in the Kansas House of Representatives from 2013 to 2021. She was defeated for reelection in 2020 by Steven Howe and she was an unsuccessful candidate for the Democratic nomination for lieutenant governor in 1994.

References

1944 births
Living people
Politicians from Sacramento, California
Politicians from Salina, Kansas
Women state legislators in Kansas
Republican Party members of the Kansas House of Representatives
21st-century American politicians
21st-century American women politicians
Candidates in the 1994 United States elections
20th-century American women
Butler Community College alumni